Dehaq (also known as Dehaq-e Fereydan, Doha, and Dowheh) is a village in Varzaq Rural District, in the Central District of Faridan County, Isfahan Province, Iran. At the 2006 census, its population was 822, in 201 families.

References 

Populated places in Faridan County